Arno Frisch (born 13 November 1975) is an Austrian actor. He has had central roles in two films by Michael Haneke, namely, Benny's Video and Funny Games.

Selected filmography
 Benny's Video (1992) as Benny
 Funny Games (1997) as Paul
 Angel Express (1998) as Doctor
 Julie's Spirit (2001) as Mark
 Blackout Journey (2004) as Valentin
 Your Name Is Justine (2005) as Niko
 The Austrian Method (2006) as Sascha
 Falco - Verdammt, wir leben noch! (2008) as Alois Hölzel
 Make Yourself at Home (2008) as John Waits
 Sleeping Songs (2009) as Rick
 Bedways (2010) as Max Konig
 Glückliche Fügung (2010) as Herbert

References

External links

1975 births
Living people
Austrian male film actors
Male actors from Vienna